Constanze Therese Adelaide Geiger, Freifrau von Ruttenstein (16 October 1835, Vienna – 24 August 1890, Dieppe) was an Austrian pianist, actor, theatrical actress, composer and singer.

Life 
Geiger, the daughter of the composer  and the court modist Theresia Geiger, born Ržiha (1804–1865), had inherited the musical talent of her father, which is already noticeable at an early stage. After she and J.W. Tomaschek and Simon Sechter piano lessons, she already tried successfully as a concert pianist at the age of six. At 13 she entered the stage in 1848. She never accepted a firm commitment, but only completed shorter or longer guest appearances.

On 23 April 1862 she married Prince Leopold of Saxe-Coburg and Gotha, and was raised with this morganatic marriage to the Freiherrenstand. With the wedding she withdrew from the stage entirely and lived with her family at Castle Radmeric. Their compositions for chamber music and church music, however, were still performed. After the death of her husband she moved to Paris.

Constanze Geiger was buried in Montmartre Cemetery.

References 
 
 Constanze Geiger bei certosaverlag.de

1835 births
1890 deaths
Morganatic spouses of German royalty
House of Saxe-Coburg-Gotha-Koháry
Austrian stage actresses
Austrian pianists
Austrian women pianists
Austrian child actresses
19th-century Austrian women singers
Austrian sopranos
Austrian women composers
Austrian people of Czech descent
Actresses from Vienna
Musicians from Vienna
19th-century women pianists